Bowers Gifford is a small village and former civil parish, now in the parish of Bowers Gifford and North Benfleet, in southern Essex, England. It is located east of Basildon, between Pitsea and Thundersley. Pillboxes in the surrounding fields testify to its wartime role in defending the Thames Estuary which it overlooks. In 1931 the parish had a population of 468.

The place-name 'Bowers Gifford' is first attested in the Domesday Book of 1086, where it appears as Bura, meaning 'cottages', from the Old English bur, in modern English bower. The 'Gifford' element relates to its lords of the manor.

History
The Giffards appear to have held the Manor of Bures Gifford as early as the reign of Edward I. In 1253, William Giffard, and Gundred his wife, were possessed of the advowson of the Church of S. Margaret de Bures; and in 1259 William Giffard is recorded as holding 100a of land in Bures, by the Sergeancy of making the King's lard or bacon, whenever he should be in England; and that he also held the Hundred of Barstable of the King for £16, and one mark, and used before to pay the King £18.

In 1281, King Edward I, in exchange for the Bailyship of the Hundred-and-Half of Barstable, confirmed to William Gifford and Robert his son, and Gundred the wife of the said Robert, in fee, the Manor of Bowers, quit and exempt of the ancient fee farm, reserving view of frankpledge and other liberties of the same; reserving also to the said Robert the fairs and profits of his market in Horingdon (Horndon), with some other exemptions, and fine warren.

The most historic surviving building is the fourteenth-century Church of St Margaret.

On 1 January 1937 the parish was abolished to form Billericay.

References

External links
 Basildon Heritage
 Basildon Borough History - Bowers Gifford & North Benfleet
 Bowers Gifford & North Benfleet Parish Council
 Bowers Gifford & North Benfleet Residents Association

Villages in Essex
Former civil parishes in Essex
Borough of Basildon